Shōichi Fujimori (December 26, 1926 – June 25, 2016) was Grand Steward of the Imperial Household Agency (1988–1996). He was born in Nagano Prefecture. He was a recipient of the Order of the Rising Sun.

Fujimori announced the death of Emperor Hirohito on January 7, 1989, at 7:55 AM.

Honour

Foreign honour
  : Honorary Commander of the Order of Loyalty to the Crown of Malaysia (P.S.M.) (1991)

References

Bibliography
 荻上悦子著「春寂寥 旧制松本高等学校人物誌」 2008年

1926 births
People from Nagano Prefecture
Grand Cordons of the Order of the Rising Sun
2016 deaths
Honorary Commanders of the Order of Loyalty to the Crown of Malaysia